Sandray is one of the Barra Isles in the Outer Hebrides of Scotland.  It never had a large population, and has been uninhabited since 1934.  It is now known for its large seabird colony.

Geography
Sandray is half a mile due south of Vatersay, and east of Flodaigh, north east of Lingeigh and Pabaigh. Maol Domhnaigh/Muldoanich is to the north east of it. There are three main peninsulas on the south end of Sandray, they are called Meanish, Leehinish and Rubha Pabbach.

See also

 List of islands of Scotland

Footnotes

Barra Isles
Uninhabited islands of the Outer Hebrides